Nihoa is a genus of South Pacific brushed trapdoor spiders first described by Tracey Churchill & Robert Raven in 1992. It is named after the island Nihoa, where the type species (N. mahina) is endemic.

Species
 it contains twenty-three species:
Nihoa annulata (Kulczyński, 1908) – New Guinea
Nihoa annulipes (Thorell, 1881) – New Guinea
Nihoa aussereri (L. Koch, 1874) – Palau Is.
Nihoa bisianumu Raven, 1994 – New Guinea
Nihoa courti Raven, 1994 – New Guinea
Nihoa crassipes (Rainbow, 1898) – New Guinea
Nihoa gressitti Raven, 1994 – New Guinea
Nihoa gruberi Raven, 1994 – Papua New Guinea (New Ireland)
Nihoa hawaiiensis (Raven, 1988) – Hawaii
Nihoa itakara Raven, 1994 – New Guinea
Nihoa kaindi Raven, 1994 – New Guinea
Nihoa karawari Raven, 1994 – New Guinea
Nihoa lambleyi Raven, 1994 – New Guinea
Nihoa madang Raven, 1994 – New Guinea
Nihoa mahina Churchill & Raven, 1992 (type) – Hawaii
Nihoa maior (Kulczyński, 1908) – New Guinea
Nihoa mambulu Raven, 1994 – Solomon Is.
Nihoa pictipes (Pocock, 1899) – New Guinea, Papua New Guinea (New Britain, New Ireland), Solomon Is.
Nihoa raleighi Raven, 1994 – New Guinea
Nihoa tatei Raven, 1994 – New Guinea
Nihoa vanuatu Raven, 1994 – Vanuatu
Nihoa variata (Thorell, 1881) – New Guinea
Nihoa verireti Raven, 1994 – New Guinea

References

Barychelidae
Mygalomorphae genera
Spiders of Oceania